Dimitris Gravas (alternate spellings: Dimitrios, Dimitreios) (born May 12, 1993) is a Greek professional basketball player for Eleftheroupoli Kavalas of the Greek 2nd Division.

Professional career
After spending one year in the Greek minors with Mantoulidis, Gravas joined Machites Doxas Pefkon, where he played in both the Greek 3rd Division and in the Greek 2nd Division. In 2016, he joined the newly promoted to the Greek Basket League (1st Division) club Promitheas Patras.

Due to the limited playing time that he had with Promitheas, he left the team and joined AEL 1964, of the Greek 2nd Division. However, he never played with AEL, and he eventually joined the Greek club Doxa Lefkadas, for the rest of the 2017–18 season. With Doxa Lefkadas, he went on to average 4 points, 2.1 rebounds and 0.6 steals per game. 

Gravas subsequently had a breakthrough couple of seasons with the Greek 2nd Division club Karditsa, as he averaged 10.2 points and 4.3 rebounds per game during the 2018–19 season, and 15.2 points, 7.0 rebounds and 2.4 assists per game during the 2019–20 season. On August 14, 2020, Gravas signed with the newly promoted to the Greek Basket League club Charilaos Trikoupis.

References

External links
Eurobasket.com Profile

1993 births
Living people
Aris B.C. players
ASK Karditsas B.C. players
Charilaos Trikoupis B.C. players
Doxa Lefkadas B.C. players
Greek men's basketball players
Machites Doxas Pefkon B.C. players
Power forwards (basketball)
Promitheas Patras B.C. players
Small forwards
Basketball players from Larissa